European Pravda is a Ukrainian online newspaper dedicated to Europe, NATO and reforms in Ukraine. "EP" website was launched in early June 2014. The publication was created by journalists and is run by Serhii Sydorenko and Yurii Panchenko.

History 
The idea to establish "European Pravda" belongs to journalists Serhii Sydorenko and Yurii Panchenko, who lost their jobs after the closure of the newspaper "Kommersant-Ukraine".

It was planned that "European Pravda" would become a division of Ukrainska Pravda, but the project became independent and was only a partner of Ukrainska Pravda.

The site was launched in early June 2014.

On January 21, 2022, the publication officially launched the English version.

Funding 
The project is funded with the support of international donors, provided they do not interfere in editorial policy. Financial support for European Pravda was provided by the European Endowment for Democracy, International Renaissance Foundation, Council of Europe, and NATO Public Diplomacy Division (PDD).

Since June 2016, European Pravda has been co-financed by the European Union. Partial co-financing is provided from the NATO PDD and from advertising revenues. From 2018, the co-donor of the project is also the National Endowment for Democracy (NED), funded from the US Congress budget.

According to the editor of "European Pravda" Serhii Sidorenko, as of February 2021, "EP" is a non-profit organization.

Rating 
According to a survey of 103 experts in 2021, the online publication covered foreign policy issues among the Ukrainian media in the best possible way.

In December 2021, Serhii Sydorenko won the National Award "High Standards of Journalism — 2021" in the category "For a sustainable, high-quality media project / product."

References

External links 
 
 

Ukrainian news websites
2014 establishments in Ukraine
Internet properties established in 2014